Essex L. Johnson (October 15, 1946 – October 29, 2020) was a professional American football running back for eight seasons for the Cincinnati Bengals and one season for the Tampa Bay Buccaneers.

College career
Johnson played defensive back/wingback at Grambling State University for legendary coach Eddie Robinson. By his final season in 1967 he helped lead the team to three consecutive Southwestern Athletic Conference (SWAC) titles.

In 2012, Johnson was inducted into the Grambling Legends Sports Hall of Fame.

Professional career

Early years
Johnson was drafted in the 6th round (156th overall) of the 1968 Common Draft by the expansion Cincinnati Bengals. Although he was drafted as a defensive back, he was converted to halfback once in the NFL.

In his rookie year of 1968, the Bengals' first season in the American Football League, he played in all 14 games, primarily as a backup to running backs Paul Robinson (American football) and Jess Phillips. He scored his first professional touchdown in the Bengals' first-ever win (in their second game). In the fourth quarter, he had a 35-yard touchdown run through the middle as the Bengals downed the Denver Broncos, 24-10.

For the season, Johnson rushed for 178 yards on only 26 attempts (a 6.8 average) and three touchdowns plus one reception for 33 yards. He also returned 22 punts for 122 yards (a 5.0 average) and he returned 14 kicks for 266 yards (a 19.0 average).

In 1969, he played in 12 games and rushed for 54 yards in 15 attempts (a 3.6 average) and caught one pass for three yards. He returned 17 punts for 85 yards (a 5.0 average) and he returned 16 kicks for 362 yards, a 22.6 average.

In 1970 as the Bengals entered the NFL, his playing time increased, as he rushed for 273 yards on 65 attempts (a 4.2 average) with two touchdowns and 15 receptions for 190 yards (a 12.7 average) and two touchdowns. He returned seven punts for 72 yards (a 10.3 average) and three kicks for 68 yards, a 22.7 average.

In 1971, his carries again increased as he rushed for 522 yards in 85 attempts (a 6.1 average) and four touchdowns. His carries included an NFL season-long 86-yard run. He caught 14 passes for 258 yards (an 18.4 average) and two touchdowns. He returned only three kicks and two punts.

Breakout seasons
In 1972, Johnson earned his nickname "The Essex Express" as he had a breakout year as the Bengals' featured running back, starting 11 games. He gained 825 yards in 212 attempts (a 3.9 average) and four touchdowns. He caught a career-best 29 passes for 420 yards (a 14.5 average) and two touchdowns.

In 1973, he started all 14 games and finished just shy of the 1,000-yard mark with a career-best 997 yards in 195 attempts  (a 5.1 average) and four touchdowns. He added 28 receptions (including a career-long 78-yarder catch) for 356 yards (a 12.7 average) and three touchdowns.

Later career
In 1974, beset by a knee injury, Johnson played in only five games, with 44 yards in 19 attempts (a 2.3 average) and eight receptions for 85 yards (a 10.6 average) and one touchdown.

In 1975, after undergoing his second knee surgery in an 18-month span, he bounced back and played in all 14 games, starting one, gaining 177 yards on 58 attempts (a 3.1 average) with one touchdown and 25 receptions for 196 yards (a 7.8 average) and one touchdown.

After eight seasons with the Bengals, during training camp prior to the 1976 season, the Bengals waived their career rushing leader on July 14, 1975 due to concerns about his knee.

Johnson was selected by the Buccaneers in the 1976 NFL Expansion Draft. For the Bucs, he played in all 14 games, starting one, and gained  166 yards in 47 attempts (a 3.5 average) and one touchdown, with 25 receptions for 201 yards (a 14.4 average) and one touchdown.

He was waived by the Bucs on February 25, 1977, ending his nine-year pro career.

Essex Johnson died on the morning of October 29, 2020.

Personal life
His son, Essex  Johnson, was a star defensive end at Verbum Dei High School in Los Angeles where, as a junior, he recorded 96 tackles and eight sacks. During his senior season, he totaled 53 tackles playing defense, and on offense he rushed for 67 yards on 19 carries and caught eight passes for 107 yards. He also ran track and played basketball.

See also
List of American Football League players

References

1946 births
2020 deaths
Players of American football from Shreveport, Louisiana
American football running backs
Grambling State Tigers football players
Cincinnati Bengals players
Tampa Bay Buccaneers players
American Football League players